The Director-General of the General Agreement on Tariffs and Trade was responsible for supervising the administrative functions of the General Agreement on Tariffs and Trade (GATT). The first Director-General, Eric Wyndham White, was appointed on March 23, 1965.  GATT had a total of 4 Director-Generals until the WTO was formed in 1995. Peter Sutherland was the last Director-General of GATT, and the first of the WTO.

See also 
Director-General of the World Trade Organization

References 

General Agreement on Tariffs and Trade